The Serie B 1970–71 was the thirty-ninth tournament of this competition played in Italy since its creation.

Teams
Novara, Massese and Casertana had been promoted from Serie C, while Brescia, Palermo and Bari had been relegated from Serie A.

Final classification

Results

Promotion tie-breaker

Atalanta and Catanzaro promoted to Serie A.

References and sources
Almanacco Illustrato del Calcio - La Storia 1898-2004, Panini Edizioni, Modena, September 2005

Serie B seasons
2
Italy